The Hamilton Olympic Club (HOC) is the oldest track and field organization in Canada. It was established in 1926 by a group of local businessmen. Many HOC athletes have competed at the provincial, national and Olympic level, including Percy Williams, Don McFarlane, Johnny Miles and Ray Lewis.

The club hosted an international club meet in 1929 against a combined team from Oxford and Cambridge University, with the English team winning by a margin of two points.

Meets associated with
 Canadian Olympic Team Trials, Civic Stadium 
 Canadian British Empire Games Trials, Ivor Wynne Stadium 
 British Empire Games
 Dual Track and Field Meet: Oxford-Cambridge Track Team Vs Hamilton Olympic Club, Olympic Stadium
 Canusa Games: Flint, Michigan Vs Hamilton, Ontario

Past members

 Robert Kerr (1882–1963) – 1908 Summer Olympics, London: Gold in the 200 meters and Bronze in the 100 meters
 Phil Edwards (1907–1971) – 1932 Summer Olympics, 1936 Summer Olympics - The "Man of Bronze"

References

External links
Official website

Sport in Hamilton, Ontario
Sports clubs established in 1926
1926 establishments in Ontario
Track and field clubs in Canada